= Hale Tegur =

Coordinates: 15°34′N 74°51′E

- Village
- Interactive map of Hale Tegur
- Country: India
- State: Karnataka
- District: Dharwad

Population (2011)
  - Total: 1,378

Languages
  - Official: Kannada
- Time zone: UTC+5:30 (IST)

Hale Tegur is a village in Dharwad district of Karnataka, India.

== Demographics ==
As of the 2011 Census of India there were 245 households in Hale Tegur and a total population of 1,378 consisting of 720 males and 658 females. There were 172 children ages 0-6.
